Agathoniki Trigoni (born October 10, 1970) is a Greek computer scientist who is a professor in the University of Oxford Department of Computer Science and a Fellow of Kellogg College. Trigoni is the Chief Technology Officer of Navenio, a company she founded to provide scalable and accurate indoor location systems. She was elected a Fellow of the Royal Academy of Engineering in 2022.

Early life and education 
Trigoni was born in Chalcis and grew up in Greece. As a teenager, she considered becoming a pianist and mathematician, but eventually settled on computer science. She studied toward her bachelor's degree in at the Athens University of Economics and Business. Her first job was at the National Bank of Greece, where she assessed credit risk and issued loans to companies. Trigoni was a doctoral researcher at the University of Cambridge. Her doctoral research considered query optimisation for object-oriented operating systems. She moved to Cornell University for postdoctoral training.

Research and career 
In 2004, Trigoni joined Birkbeck, University of London as a lecturer. She moved to the University of Oxford in 2007, where she developed the Cyber Physical Systems Group and was made a Fellow of Kellogg College. She was also appointed Director of the Engineering and Physical Sciences Research Council Centre for Doctoral Training on Autonomous Intelligent Machines and Systems.

Trigoni's research considers the development of intelligent and autonomous sensor systems for healthcare, positioning and environmental monitoring. In particular, she has developed novel location systems that can operate indoors. Location systems often struggle to penetrate infrastructure, which compromises the use of high frequency electromagnetic waves. Trigoni looks to combine multiple pervasive technologies to improve the reliability of positioning information. These technologies include visual odometer, inertial tracking and magneto-inductive positioning.

In 2015, Trigoni founded Navenio, a company which provides scalable, robust and accurate indoor location systems. She is the chief technology officer. During the COVID-19 pandemic, Navenio was used by National Health Service trusts for workflow optimisation.

Awards and honours 
 2022 Fellow of the Royal Academy of Engineering
 2022 Women in IT Awards CTO of the Year

Selected publications

References 

1970 births
Living people
Athens University of Economics and Business alumni
Alumni of the University of Cambridge
Cornell University faculty
Greek computer scientists
People from Chalcis
Greek emigrants to the United Kingdom
Academics of the University of Oxford
Fellows of the Royal Academy of Engineering
Female Fellows of the Royal Academy of Engineering